The 2021–22 Indian Women's League season (also known as Hero Indian Women's League for sponsorship reasons) was the fifth season of the Indian Women's League, the top division women's professional football league in India. The qualifying round was held from 1–5 April at the Ambedkar Stadium in New Delhi. The final round was scheduled to kick-off from mid-April in Bhubaneswar, Odisha and continue till the last week of May. On 26 May, Gokulam Kerala successfully defended their title with a convincing win against Sethu in a title decider on the last matchday, and became the first club to do it.

Qualifier

Teams

Table 
The following four teams from four states played each other once during April in the qualifying round at the Ambedkar Stadium in New Delhi.

Matches

Teams

Stadiums and locations 
The matches were played at three venues located in Bhubaneswar, Odisha; Kalinga Stadium, O.S.A.P 7th Battalion Ground and Capital High School Ground.

Personnel and sponsorships

Foreign players
Note: Players in bold has senior international cap(s) for their respective nations.

AIFF allowed maximum of two foreign players per team but only one can be part of starting 11. Indian Arrows cannot sign any foreign player as they are part of AIFF's developmental program.

Regular season

Standings

Fixture and results
All matches were played at neutral venues. The "home" and "away" are designated to identify Team 1 and Team 2 respectively.

Positions by round

Results by match
The table lists the results of teams after each match.

Season statistics

Top scorers
Note: Only the top 5 goalscorers have been listed below

Most clean sheets 
Note: Only the top 5 goalkeepers with most clean sheets have been listed below.

Match award 
Note: Player of the match awarded only for the matches played in the regular season, and not in the qualifier.

Season awards

References

Indian Women's League
Ind
1
Indian Women's League season
Sports competitions in Odisha